Nandi Awards presented annually by Government of Andhra Pradesh. First awarded in 1964.

1991 Nandi Awards Winners List

References 

1991 Indian film awards
Nandi Awards